DLD can refer to:
 Data Retention Directive in Norwegian (Datalagringsdirektivet)
 Democratic League of Dardania, a political party in Kosovo
 Demon Lord Dante, an anime and manga series
 Deutsche Linux-Distribution (German Linux Distribution), a Linux distribution produced from 1992 to 1999
 Dihydrolipoamide dehydrogenase
 Digital Life Design, a conference network
 DLD (software), a library package for the C programming language that performs dynamic link editing
 Geilo Airport, Dagali, IATA code DLD 
 Developmental language disorder
 , Mexican rock band